Staryye Kamyshly (İśke Qamışlı) is a rural locality (a selo) and the administrative centre of Starokamyshlinsky Selsoviet, Kushnarenkovsky District, Bashkortostan, Russia. The population was 701 as of 2010. There are 48 streets.

Geography 
Staryye Kamyshly is located 38 km southeast of Kushnarenkovo (the district's administrative centre) by road. Ilmurzino is the nearest rural locality.

References 

Rural localities in Kushnarenkovsky District